Joseph Ferdinand Gueldry (21 May 1858 – 17 February 1945) was a French painter. He studied under Jean-Léon Gérôme at École des Beaux-Arts in Paris. Gueldry debuted his artwork at 20 years old in 1878 at the yearly Paris Salon exhibit, and continued to be featured there regularly until 1933. That same year he was also awarded the Chevalier de la Légion d'Honneur. His work was part of the painting event in the art competition at the 1912 Summer Olympics.  As a founding member of the Nautical Society at Marne in Joinville-le-Pont (Société Nautique de Marne) and an avid rower his paintings often depict rowing, regattas and maritime themes. His work is still relevant, with the painting Launching the boat sold for $150,731 USD in 2017.

References

Further reading
 "Ferdinand Gueldry", Bénézit Dictionary of Artists, Oxford Art Online, 2011 
 Thieme und Felix Becker. Band 15: Gresse–Hanselmann. E. A. Seemann, Leipzig 1922, p. 198 (online: Internet Archive)
 Bénézit: Dictionnaire des peintres, sculpteurs, dessinateurs et graveurs, 3rd edn., Gründ, Paris 1976, vol. 5, p. 265
 Gérald Schurr and Pierre Cabanne, Les Petits Maîtres de la peinture 1820-1920, Paris, Les Éditions de l’amateur, 2014, p. 487
 Musée de Nogent-sur-Marne, Ferdinand Gueldry, peintre de l'eau et de la lumière: catalogue, exhibition 15 September 2018–29 May 2019, Nogent-sur-Marne, Créa'3P, 2018, 27 pp.
 Michel Riousset, Les environs de la Marne et leurs peintres, Amatteis, 1986 (reprint 1997)
 List of Légion d'honneur recipients by name (G)

External links
RKD - Nederlands Instituut voor Kunstgeschiedenis: Ferdinand Gueldry
Gueldry, peintre du canotage et de l'aviron, with images of paintings

1858 births
1945 deaths
19th-century French painters
20th-century French painters
20th-century French male artists
French male painters
Olympic competitors in art competitions
Painters from Paris
19th-century French male artists